Kotschy's gecko (Mediodactylus kotschyi) is a species of gecko, a lizard in the family Gekkonidae. The species is native to southeastern Europe and the Middle East. It is named in honour of the Austrian botanist and explorer Karl Georg Theodor Kotschy.

Description
Kotschy's gecko is a slender lizard growing to a length of about  including its tail. Females grow slightly larger than males. The limbs and tail are slim and there are small tubercles on the back and tail. The digits do not have adhesive pads but the toes are relatively long with a kink in the middle. The colour is rather variable and may have a background of yellowish-grey, greyish-brown, dark brown or reddish-black. The dorsal surface is marked with "W"-shaped transverse bands of darker colour. Like other geckos, the markings remain the same but the overall shade can be darker in cool conditions and paler in the heat of the day. The underparts may be yellowish or orange.

Distribution and habitat
Kotschy's gecko is mostly distributed along the coastal areas of the Eastern Mediterranean Sea and the Black Sea. It is native to Ukraine (Crimean Peninsula), Bulgaria, Serbia, North Macedonia, Albania, Greece, Cyprus, Turkey, Syria, Lebanon, Jordan, and Israel. It can also be found in Southern Italy (Apulia) and Hungary, where it has probably been introduced.

Its typical habitat is cliffs, dry stony areas, scrub, tree trunks, stone walls, and the external and internal walls of buildings. It is found at elevations of up to  but is mostly a lowland species.

Behaviour
Kotschy's gecko is mainly nocturnal but at cooler times of year it is often active in the day as well, especially early and late. It climbs very well despite having no adhesive pads, but spends less time on cliffs and climbs less high than the wall lizards (Podarcis) spp., with which it is often found. When disturbed, it retreats into dense undergrowth, hides in crevices among rocks, or clings onto the underside of overhangs. It is infrequently found in buildings. The voice is a repeated high-pitched "chick", and males and females may call to each other during courtship.

Reproduction
These offspring become mature in about two years, and Kotschy's gecko has been known to live for nine years in captivity.

Status
Kotschy's gecko is listed by the IUCN as being of "Least Concern". This is because it has a very wide range and is common over much of this range. The population trend is unknown, but it faces no particular threats, although deforestation might be a threat in Israel and Jordan where it is mostly found on tree trunks. It is possible that this might be a species complex, and if so, individual populations might need to be placed in a more threatened category.

References

Further reading
Boulenger GA (1885). Catalogue of the Lizards in the British Museum (Natural History). Second Edition. Volume I. Geckonidæ ... London: Trustees of the British Museum (Natural History). (Taylor and Francis, printers). xii + 436 pp. + Plates I-XXXII. (Gymnodactylus kotschyi, p. 29).
Steindachner F (1870). "Herpetologische Notizen (II). I. Reptilien gesammelt während einer Reise in Senegambien (October bis December 1868) ". Sitzungsberichte der Mathematisch-Naturwissenschaftlichen Classe der Kaiserlichen Akademie der Wissenschaften 62: 326-335 + Plates I-VIII. (Gymnodactylus kotschyi, new species, pp. 329–330 + Plate I, Figures 1-2). (in German).

Mediodactylus
Lizards of Asia
Lizards of Europe
Reptiles described in 1870